Jared Saunders (born 18 September 1990) is a South African professional rugby union player. He plays at hooker for London Scottish in the RFU Championship.

On 13 April 2017, Saunders left Saracens after seven seasons with the club to join Jersey Reds in the RFU Championship. Saunder's was a key part of the front row, making 17 appearances in the 2017-2018 RFU Championship Season, an integral part of the 5th place finish for the Jersey side.

On 29 May 2018, Saunders switched Jersey for London Scottish (ahead of the 2018-2019 season).

References

External links
Premiership Rugby Profile
European Professional Club Rugby Profile
Saracens Profile

South African rugby union players
London Scottish F.C. players
1990 births
Living people
Rugby union hookers
Rugby union players from KwaZulu-Natal